Prabath Ruwan is a Sri Lankan international footballer who plays as a goalkeeper for Air Force in the Sri Lanka Football Premier League.

References

Sri Lankan footballers
Living people
Sri Lanka international footballers
Association football goalkeepers
Air Force SC players
1993 births
Sri Lanka Football Premier League players